Semezdin Mehmedinović (born 1960 in Kiseljak is a Bosnian writer and magazine editor.

After studying Librarianship and Comparative Literature in Sarajevo, he worked as an editor of "Lica" and "Valter" magazines, which served as a voice of opposition to the ruling Communist regime. Mehmedinović published his first book of poetry "Modrac"  in 1984, and his second book "Emigrant" in 1990. Shortly before the Bosnian war, in 1991, he founded the cultural magazine "Fantom slobode" (transl. "Phantom of Freedom"). When war broke out in 1992, Mehmedinović remained in Sarajevo with his family. The same year, he published an early version of Sarajevo Blues. Shortly thereafter, he and a group of friends founded the weekly political magazine BH Dani (transl. "Days") in 1992, to give a voice for democracy and pluralism in times of genocide.

In 1994, during the Bosnian War, Semezdin and Benjamin Filipović co-wrote and co-directed the film "Mizaldo, kraj Teatra".

In 1996, after the end of the siege of Sarajevo and the conclusion of the Bosnian war, Mehmedinović emigrated to the United States, and lived in Arlington, Virginia. Currently he lives in Sarajevo. 

"Sarajevo Blues" was published in English in 1998. "Sarajevo Blues" was translated into German, Dutch, Hungarian and Turkish. In 2002, Mehmedinović published another book of poems entitled "Devet Alexandrija".

In 2009, Semezdin Mehmedinović and Miljenko Jergović co-wrote "Transatlantic Mail", a book of personal letters. Semezdin published "Soviet Computer" in March 2011, and "Self-portrait With a Messenger Bag" in June 2012. His book "Soviet Computer" was published in Hungary in 2014. His "Window Book" was published in Zagreb in August 2014, followed by “Me’med, Red Bandanna and a Snowflake” 2017, for which go was awarded the Meša Selimović Award for the best novel written in Bosnia, and Mirko Kovač Literature Award in Croatia.

Selected works
Nine Alexandrias, City Lights Publishers, 2003.
Soviet Computer, 2011.
Self-portrait With a Messenger Bag, 2012.
Window Book, 2014.
Me’med, Red Bandanna and a Snowflake, 2017

References

External links
 (Bosnian)

1960 births
Living people
Bosniaks of Bosnia and Herzegovina
Bosnia and Herzegovina emigrants to the United States
Writers from Tuzla
Writers from Sarajevo
Bosniak writers